Lion's City may refer to:
MAN Lion's City, a range of buses
Singapore, often known as the Lion City
Lviv, lion city in Ukraine